The Bei'an–Heihe railway, named the Beihei Railway, is a railway line running between Bei'an and Heihe in Heilongjiang in north-eastern China.

History

Original line
Construction of a railway line from Bei'an to Heihe was initiated by the Manchukuo National Railway, which had been formed in 1933 by nationalising privately owned railways in the territory of the puppet state of Manchukuo, which had been established by Imperial Japan in the previous year. Work on the new line, called the Beihei Line (Hokkoku Line in Japanese), began at Bei'an, terminus of the main line of the former Haike Railway, in August 1933, and the first section,  from Bei'an to Chenqing, was opened in November 1934. Work on the remaining section, from Chenqing to Heihe, began in May 1934, and was completed in February 1935. The complete line was inaugurated on 1 December 1935, with 20 stations, 29 bridges, and one tunnel.

In August 1945, the Soviet Army invaded Manchukuo and took control of the Beihei Line. When the Heilongjiang River froze that winter, they built a temporary bridge over the ice to connect the line to the Soviet Railways at Blagoveshchensk on the other side of the border. The Soviet Army used this temporary connection to ship equipment stolen from Manchuria, and prior to the withdrawal in April 1946, the Beihei Line was ransacked, with anything moveable - locomotives, rolling stock, bridge components, tracks, etc. - being shipped to the Soviet Union. In the spring of 1949, basic repairs were undertaken on the line, but due to the difficulty of running trains, the tracks were removed in the autumn of that year.

Reconstruction
The project to rebuild the Bei'an–Heihe railway line - named Beihei Railway by China Railway - was officially initiated in May 1963, and the  section from Bei'an to Longzhen was reopened in September of the same year. Service on that section began on a temporary basis in August 1964. The  line from Bei'an to Jusheng was opened in November 1965, and officially put into operation in January 1966. However, the  stretch from Longzhen to Jusheng was soon dismantled again, and due to worsening relations between China and the USSR, the planned reconstruction of the Longzhen–Heihe section was suspended for many years, until it was finally begun on 15 July 1986. Work was completed on 19 September 1989, and regular service between Longzhen and Heihe commenced on 14 December.

Upgrade 
As of 2021, a project is underway to upgrade the Longzhen-Bei'an section of the line.

Route

References

Railway lines in China
Rail transport in Heilongjiang
Railway lines in Manchukuo
Railway lines opened in 1935